Pyrenographa is a genus of fungi in the family Pyrenulaceae.

References

External links
Pyrenographa at Index Fungorum

Pyrenulales
Taxa named by André Aptroot